Kristin Marie Vesely is an American, former collegiate All-American, professional softball outfielder and current head coach at Houston. She played college softball at Oklahoma.

Coaching career

Houston
On June 10, 2016, Kristin Vesely was announced as the new head coach of the Houston softball program. She was promoted to the role of head coach after serving as associate head coach for 2 years. In 2019, Vesely lead the Cougars to the Regional Final of the Austin Regional to play Texas, Houston lost both games of the Regional final to Texas.

Statistics

Head coaching record
Sources:

College

References

External links
Oklahoma bio

Living people
Female sports coaches
American softball coaches
Oklahoma Sooners softball players
Houston Cougars softball coaches
Softball players from Arizona
Sportspeople from Phoenix, Arizona
People from Phoenix, Arizona
1984 births